The 2016 Northwest Missouri State Bearcats football team represented Northwest Missouri State University  as a member of the Mid-America Intercollegiate Athletics Association (MIAA) during the 2016 NCAA Division II football season. Led by sixth-year head coach Adam Dorrel, the Bearcats compiled an overall record of 15–0 with a mark of 11–0 in conference play, winning the MIAA title. They won the program's sixth NCAA Division II Football Championship with a win over North Alabama in the NCAA Division II Championship Game.

The Bearcats played their home games on the newly-renovated Bearcat Stadium in Maryville, Missouri. 2016 was the 100th season in school history.

Preseason
The Bearcats entered the 2016 season as the defending NCAA Division II National Champions, after finishing the 2015 season with a 15–0 record overall and in conference play. On August 2, 2016 at the MIAA Football Media Day, the Bearcats were chosen to finish in 1st place in both the Coaches Poll and in the Media Poll.

Sporting News released their Top-25 on May 25, 2016, landing Northwest Missouri State at #1. On June 15, 2016, Lindy's NCAA Division II Preseason Top 25 released its poll ranking Northwest Missouri State at #1.

On August 15, the American Football Coaches Association released the Preseason Division II Poll, landing Northwest Missouri State at #1.

On August 22, D2football.com released its Top 25 poll, ranking Northwest Missouri State 1st.

Personnel

Coaching staff
Along with Dorrel, there are 12 assistants.

Roster

Schedule

Game summaries

Regular season

Emporia State

Washburn

Nebraska–Kearney

Missouri Southern

Central Missouri

Central Oklahoma

Northeastern State

Lindenwood

Pittsburg State

Fort Hays State

Missouri Western

With their win over Missouri Western, the Bearcats clinched their fourth straight conference title.

Post-season

Emporia State

Entering postseason as the No. 1 team, the Bearcats earn a bye during the first week of playoffs and will play the winner of the Emporia State and Minnesota–Duluth game.

Harding

Ferris State

References

Northwest Missouri State
Northwest Missouri State Bearcats football seasons
NCAA Division II Football Champions
Mid-America Intercollegiate Athletics Association football champion seasons
College football undefeated seasons
Northwest Missouri State Bearcats football